The 2004 If Stockholm Open was an ATP men's tennis tournament played on hard courts and held at the Kungliga tennishallen in Stockholm, Sweden. It was the 36th edition of the event and part of the ATP International Series of the 2004 ATP Tour. The tournament was held from 25 October through 31 October 2004. Unseeded Thomas Johansson won the singles title.

Finals

Singles

 Thomas Johansson defeated  Andre Agassi, 3–6, 6–3, 7–6(7–4)

Doubles

 Feliciano López /  Fernando Verdasco defeated  Wayne Arthurs /  Paul Hanley, 6–4, 6–4

References

External links
 Official website 
 Official website 
 ATP tournament profile

 
Stockholm Open
Stockholm Open
Stockholm Open
Stockholm Open
2000s in Stockholm